Mughalwala or Mughal Wala is a village in Patti-14 Tehsil in Tarn Taran district of Punjab state, India.

References

Villages in Tarn Taran district